The 1984 New York Cosmos season was the fourteenth season for the New York Cosmos playing in the now-defunct North American Soccer League. It was the final year of the original Cosmos playing in the original NASL; they would play three friendlies in 1985 before disbanding.  During the 1984 season, the Cosmos finished in third place in the Eastern Division, failing to qualify for the playoffs for the first time since 1975. It was also the first season since 1978 that the Cosmos failed to finish first in the overall league table, ending a streak of six premierships.

Squad  

 

Source:

Results 
Source:

Friendlies 
Source:

Trans-Atlantic Cup

NASL regular season 

Pld = Games Played, W = Wins, L = Losses, D = Draws, GF = Goals For, GA = Goals Against, Pts = Points
6 points for a win, 3 points for a draw, 0 points for a loss, 1 point for each goal scored (up to three per game).

Eastern Division Standings

Overall League Placing 

Source:

Matches

Transfers

In

1985
After the disbanding of the North American Soccer League, the Cosmos opted to play as an independent team. After poor attendances and lack of media interest, the club shut down operations upon playing a handful of friendly matches.

References

See also
1984 North American Soccer League season
List of New York Cosmos seasons

New York Cosmos
New York Cosmos seasons
New York
Cosmos